The 2018 German FIM Speedway Grand Prix was the ninth race of the 2018 Speedway Grand Prix season. It took place on September 22 at the Bergring Arena in Teterow, Germany.

Riders 
First reserve Niels-Kristian Iversen replaced the injured Patryk Dudek. The Speedway Grand Prix Commission also nominated Kai Huckenbeck as the wild card, and Martin Smolinski and Kevin Wölbert both as Track Reserves.

Results 
The Grand Prix was won by Tai Woffinden, who beat defending world champion Jason Doyle, Bartosz Zmarzlik and Greg Hancock in the final. As a result of winning the Grand Prix, Woffinden extended his overall lead over Zmarzlik in the world championship standings to ten points with just one round remaining.

Heat details

Intermediate classification

References 

2018
Germany
Speedway competitions in Germany
2018 in German motorsport